Dakari may refer to:

Dakari or Dakarai Gwitira, Zimbabwe-born music producer
Dakari Johnson (born 1995), American basketball player

See also
Dakarai